Roland Mitoraj (born 5 February 1940) is a French former professional footballer and manager.

International career 
Mitoraj played three matches for France from 1967 to 1968.

After football 
From 1976 to 1990, Mitoraj worked for Adidas. He would sell products from Le Coq Sportif and Arena, brands which depended on Adidas. He was a commercial vendor. Simultaneously, he coached Cournon-d'Auvergne.

In 2003, Mitoraj retired to go live in Vorey for four years. He would watch his favorite team Saint-Étienne at the Stade Geoffroy-Guichard every weekend. However, in December 2007, he came out of retirement in order to become an administrator at Saint-Étienne.

Honours

Player 
Saint-Étienne

 Division 1: 1963–64, 1966–67, 1967–68, 1968–69, 1969–70
Division 2: 1962–63 
Coupe de France: 1967–68, 1969–70; runner-up: 1959–60 

Paris Saint-Germain

 Division 2: 1970–71

Manager 
Aix

 Coupe de Provence: 1975; runner-up: 1976

Notes

References

External links 
 Profile on FFF site
 
 

1940 births
Living people
French footballers
Sportspeople from Bourges
French people of Polish descent
Association football defenders
France international footballers
Ligue 1 players
Ligue 2 players
Championnat National players
AS Saint-Étienne players
Paris Saint-Germain F.C. players
FC Girondins de Bordeaux players
Pays d'Aix FC players
Pays d'Aix FC managers
Footballers from Centre-Val de Loire